Heinrich Behnke (April 10, 1882 – June 19, 1952) was a seaman first class serving in the United States Navy who received the Medal of Honor for bravery.

Biography
Behnke was born April 10, 1882, in Germany and after immigrating to the United States he joined the navy in 1902.

He died June 19, 1952, and is buried in Long Island National Cemetery Farmingdale, New York.

Medal of Honor citation
Rank and organization: Seaman First Class, U.S. Navy. Born: 10 April 1882, Germany. Accredited to: Washington, D.C. G.O. No.: 182, 20 March 1905.

Citation:

While serving aboard the U.S.S. Iowa, Behnke displayed extraordinary heroism at the time of the blowing out of the manhole plate of boiler D on board that vessel, 25 January 1905.

See also

List of Medal of Honor recipients in non-combat incidents

References

External links

1882 births
1952 deaths
United States Navy Medal of Honor recipients
United States Navy sailors
Military personnel from Washington, D.C.
German-born Medal of Honor recipients
German emigrants to the United States
Burials in New York (state)
Non-combat recipients of the Medal of Honor